Ronald "RJ" Cyler II (born March 21, 1995) is an American actor. He is best known for his roles in the films Me and Earl and the Dying Girl (2015), Power Rangers (2017), The Harder They Fall (2021), and Emergency (2022) as well as the Showtime series I'm Dying Up Here (2017–2018) and Scream: Resurrection (2019).

Early life
Cyler was raised in Jacksonville, Florida, the youngest of three children of Katina, a cook, and Ronald Cyler, a truck driver. His parents, who were working but struggling, sold what they had to move from Florida to California in 2013. They were homeless until shortly before Cyler was cast in his role in Me and Earl and the Dying Girl. Cyler finished high school in California.

Career
In 2013, Cyler appeared in the short film Second Chances. In 2015, Cyler got his biggest acting break when he co-starred in the film Me and Earl and the Dying Girl, based on the book of the same name by Jesse Andrews. The film had its world premiere at the Sundance Film Festival on January 25, 2015. Shortly after the premiere, Fox Searchlight Pictures acquired distribution rights for the film and released it on June 12, 2015. In 2016, Cyler appeared in the HBO series Vice Principals.

Cyler played autistic blue ranger Billy Cranston in Lionsgate Films' 2017 reboot of the Power Rangers.

Cyler part of the ensemble of I'm Dying Up Here, a Showtime drama executive-produced by Jim Carrey, which ran from 2017 to 2018. In 2018, he co-starred in the drama film White Boy Rick, directed by Yann Demange, about Richard Wershe Jr.

On September 13, 2017, it was announced that Cyler joined as a series regular in the third season of the VH1 slasher television series Scream. He starred in the lead role of Deion Elliot. The season premiered on July 8, 2019.

In 2018, Cyler starred as Dan in the Netflix comedy-drama film, Sierra Burgess Is a Loser. On November 13, 2018, Cyler was cast in a recurring role on the second season of the CW series Black Lightning.

In January 2019, Cyler was reportedly cast in the DC Universe horror series, Swamp Thing.

Filmography

Film

Television

Awards and nominations

References

External links

1995 births
Living people
Male actors from Jacksonville, Florida
American male television actors
African-American male actors
American male film actors
21st-century American male actors
21st-century African-American people